The following is a complete collection of results for rugby league test matches played at the Sydney Cricket Ground since 1914. The list includes test matches and Rugby League World Cup matches. The Australian team has played in all but three of the tests at the SCG.

Test matches and other internationals

Records

* Great Britain also played as Northern Union and The Lions

See also

 Australian national rugby league team
 The Ashes (rugby league)
 Australia vs New Zealand in rugby league
 Rugby League World Cup
 Australian Rugby League
 Sydney Cricket Ground

References

Further reading
 Whiticker, Alan; Collis, Ian (1994) Rugby League Test Matches in Australia, ABC Books 

Test matches at the Sydney Cricket Ground
Sydney-sport-related lists
Sydney Cricket Ground